Chrysoblephus laticeps ('golden-eyed broad head'), also known as the red roman or roman seabream, is a species of sea bream from southern Africa, ranging from Namibia to the Eastern Cape. There are also old records from Madagascar and Mauritius, but the validity of these is doubtful. It is a slow-growing species showing late sexual maturity, and is closely related to the Red Stumpnose. Juveniles mature in seaweed beds and feed on mollusks, crustaceans, worms and fish. Adults are benthic feeders, living on crustaceans, sea urchins and polychaete worms.

Mature females transform into territorial males upon further growth (see Protogyny). The species forms pairs before an elaborate courtship ritual and spawning, the eggs being released well above the seafloor.

The Red Roman is of robust build, orange to red in colour, showing a striking white saddle and white bar over the gill cover, with a horizontal blue line linking the eyes. Its canines are prominent and it has several rows of molars in both upper and lower jaws.

These small home ranges suggest that dispersal of the species is mainly by planktonic larvae. Activity is markedly reduced during the night, and when cold-water upwelling occur, fish seek the shelter of caves. Over the spawning period, females wander beyond their normal home boundaries.

This species is sought after by line fishers, operating from the shore or from boats within the inshore zone. Linefishing is the least destructive fishing method, having little impact when carried out with rod and reel or a handline. Other methods, such as spearfishing, lead to overfishing and a population decline in areas such as Port Elizabeth and False Bay. Its slow growth renders the species particularly vulnerable. There is evidence of some recovery of numbers within Marine Protected Areas.

References

External links

Photo Gallery
South African Journal of Science vol.105 no.9-10 Sept/Oct 2009
Southern African Sustainable Seafood Initiative
Image showing the prominent canines

Sparidae
Fish of the Atlantic Ocean
Fish of the Pacific Ocean
Fish described in 1830
Taxa named by Achille Valenciennes